Cynthia Doerner (née Sieler) (born 11 February 1951) is an Australian former international tennis player. She competed in the Australian Open four times, from 1973 to 1979.

References

External links
 
 

1951 births
Living people
Australian female tennis players
Place of birth missing (living people)